The Kings of Uí Fiachrach Aidhne were rulers of a Trícha cét located in the cóiced of Connacht, Ireland.

Early kings
Goibnenn mac Conaill, fl. 538
Cobthach mac Gabran
Colmán mac Cobthaig, died 622
Loingsech mac Colmáin, died 655
Guaire Aidne mac Colmáin, died 663
Ceallach mac Guaire, died 666
Muirchertach Nár mac Guairi, died 668
Fergal Aidne mac Artgaile, died 696
Conchubhar mac Cumasgach, died 769
Art mac Flaitnia, died 772
Anluan mac Conchobhar, died 805
Cathal Aidhne mac Ailell, died 812
Cleireach mac Ceadach, died 820
Tighearnach mac Cathmogha, died 822
Uathmharan mac Brocan, died 871, 
Maelfabhaill mac Cleireach, died 887

High Medieval kings
Eidhean mac Cléireach, fl. 908
Tighearnach ua Cleirigh, died 916
Mael Macduach, died 920
Domhnall mac Lorcan, died 937
Flann Ua Clerigh, fl. 952 
Comhaltan Ua Clerigh, fl. 964
Mac Comhaltan Ua Cleirigh, fl. 998, alias Muireadhach?
Gilla Ceallaigh Ua Cleirigh, died 1003
Mael Ruanaidh na Paidre Ua hEidhin, died 1014
Mhic Mac Comhaltan Ua Cleirigh, died 1025, alias Comhaltan?
Mael Fabhaill Ua hEidhin, died 1048
Gilla na Naomh Ua hEidhin, died 1100
Aodh Ua hEidhin, died 1121
Gilla Mo Choinni Ua Cathail, died 1147
Gilla Cheallaigh Ua hEidhin, died 1153
Muirgheas Ua hEidhin, died 1180
Owen Ó hEidhin, died 1253 
Eoghan Ó hEidhin, died 1340

Family tree

              Eochaid Mugmedon
          =Mongfind             + Cairenn
             |                  |
    _|___       |
    |        |          |       |
    |        |          |       |
    Brion Fiachrae  Ailill  Niall Noígíallach died c.450. 
             |                   (Uí Néill)
    _|
    |                 |             | 
    |                 |             |
    Amalgaid          Nath Í       Macc Ercae
                      |
   ___|_
   |           |                           |
   |           |                           | 
   Echu   Ailill Molt, d.482   Fiachnae     
   |                                       |
   |                                       |
  (Uí Fiachrach Aidhne)     (Uí Fiachrach Muaidhe)
   |
   |
   Eogan
   |
   |
   Conall
   |
   |
   |          |
   |          |  
   Gabran     Goibnenn mac Conaill, fl. 538
   |
   |
   Cobthach
   |
   |
   Colmán mac Cobthaig d. 622
   |
   |
   |                                       |
   |                                       |
  Loingsech mac Colmáin, d.655     Guaire Aidne mac Colmáin, d. 663
                                           |
       |
       |                                   |        
       |                                   |      
       Muirchertach Nar, d.668.            Artgal  
                                           |  
                                           |                                          
                                           Fergal

References

Irish Kings and High-Kings, Francis John Byrne, 2001, Dublin, Four Courts Press, 
CELT: Corpus of Electronic Texts at University College Cork

Ui Fiachrach
Medieval royal families
Lists of Irish monarchs